Juan Rostagno (born 1 April 1899, date of death unknown) was an Argentine sports shooter. He competed at the 1936 Summer Olympics and 1948 Summer Olympics.

References

1899 births
Year of death missing
Argentine male sport shooters
Olympic shooters of Argentina
Shooters at the 1936 Summer Olympics
Shooters at the 1948 Summer Olympics
Sportspeople from Buenos Aires